The Entertainers is a one-hour American variety show which aired on CBS from September 25, 1964 through March 27, 1965.

Produced by Joe Hamilton, the series featured three hosts:
Hamilton's then-wife Carol Burnett, Bob Newhart, and Caterina Valente.  In order to serve as a regular host, it was necessary for Burnett to leave her role in the Broadway musical Fade Out - Fade In, and she was summarily sued by the show's producers for breach of contract, resulting in her return to the musical in February 1965 for what turned out to be its final weeks.

Broadcast weekly from New York, where it was taped Friday evenings at CBS Studio 50 (now the Ed Sullivan Theater), the variety show format was typical  of the period. It contained a mix of comedy sketches, musical numbers performed by a regular group of series artists and having one or two guest stars (such as Boris Karloff, Phil Silvers, and Chita Rivera) who hosted, alongside Burnett and Valente each week. It initially aired Friday nights at 8:30pm ET/PT, but after not doing well in the ratings the show was moved, in January 1965, to Saturdays at 9:00pm ET/PT, with the format slightly altered:  Newhart and a few of the series' regulars left the cast, Burnett and Valente assumed co-hosting duties for the remainder of the series' run, and new theme music was created.

Repertory company
The repertory company included:

Art Buchwald
Ruth Buzzi (joined in 1965)
Don Crichton
John Davidson
Dom DeLuise
Tessie O'Shea
The Ernie Flatt Dancers
The Peter Gennaro Dancers
The Harry Zimmerman Orchestra

Notable episodes
25 September 1964: The show premiered on CBS the same week The Cara Williams Show, The Munsters, The Baileys of Balboa, Gomer Pyle-U.S.M.C., The Reporter, Gilligan's Island, Mr. Broadway, and My Living Doll debuted on the network.
13 November 1964: The show abandoned its usual format to present a full-hour documentary about the Beatles' American tour.  The Entertainers had premiered the same week the Beatles film A Hard Day's Night opened in theatres.
11 December 1964: Thelma Ritter joined series regulars Newhart, Valente, and Dom DeLuise.
25 December 1964: Burnett, Valente, Buchwald and Newhart performed in a Christmas special.
16 January 1965: Burnett and Valente co-hosted, with Boris Karloff and Chita Rivera as guest stars. The kinescope copy of this episode is the most viewed episode outside of its original broadcast, being widely circulated amongst collectors.

References

External links 
 

CBS original programming
Television series by CBS Studios
1960s American variety television series
1960s American sketch comedy television series
1964 American television series debuts
1965 American television series endings
Black-and-white American television shows
English-language television shows
Television shows filmed in New York (state)